Mujtaba Jaafar (born 12 August 1981) is a Qatari footballer who currently plays for Umm Salal as a midfielder.

Career
In June 2011, Jaafar transferred to the newly promoted club El Jaish.  In January 2012, he joined Umm Salal. However, shortly after the transfer materialized, he suffered an injury in his first match which made him miss the rest of the season.

References

External links
Footballdatabase.eu
QATAR STARS LEAGUE - QSL.com.qa

1981 births
Living people
Qatari footballers
Qatar Stars League players
Qatari Second Division players
Al-Wakrah SC players
El Jaish SC players
Al-Markhiya SC players
Al-Arabi SC (Qatar) players
Umm Salal SC players
Al Ahli SC (Doha) players
Association football midfielders